Anders Järryd and Tomáš Šmíd were the defending champions, but Järryd decided to rest in order to compete at the Davis Cup the following week. Šmíd teamed up with Andreas Maurer and lost in the quarterfinals to Carl Limberger and Mark Woodforde.

Hans Simonsson and Stefan Simonsson won the title by defeating Limberger and Woodforde 6–3, 6–4 in the final.

Seeds

Draw

Draw

References

External links
 Official results archive (ATP)
 Official results archive (ITF)

Dutch Open (tennis)
1985 Grand Prix (tennis)